A list of American films released in 1991. 
The Silence of the Lambs won the Academy Award for Best Picture.

Highest-grossing films
 Terminator 2: Judgment Day, $519,843,345
 Beauty and the Beast, $424,967,620
 Robin Hood: Prince of Thieves, $390,493,908
 The Addams Family
 City Slickers
 Star Trek VI: The Undiscovered Country
 Thelma & Louise
 Fried Green Tomatoes
 Hot Shots!
 JFK

A-Z

See also
 1991 in American television
 1991 in the United States

External links

 
 List of 1991 box office number-one films in the United States

1991
Films
Lists of 1991 films by country or language